Coutts is a UK private banking house.

Coutts may also refer to:
Coutts (surname)
Coutts, Alberta, a village in Alberta, Canada
Sweetgrass–Coutts Border Crossing, a major border crossing between Alberta and Montana
 was an East Indiaman launched in 1797 that participated in two notable actions, the action of 4 August 1800 and the Battle of Pulo Aura before she was broken up in 1815.

See also
Couts (disambiguation), various meanings
Coot, a water fowl
Coutts Crossing, New South Wales, a village in New South Wales, Australia
Coutts Inlet, Nunavut, Canada